Lambros Couloubaritsis (born 1941) is a Greek-born Belgian philosopher.

Life
Lambros Couloubaritsis received his PhD in philosophy from the Free University of Brussels after studying chemistry at the University of Liège. He teaches philosophy at the Free University of Brussels, where he is also the director of Ancient Philosophy Center. He is internationally recognized as a specialist of Aristotle. He has received honorary doctorates from the universities of Oradea, Crete, Athens, Liège and Charles de Gaulle University – Lille III.

Couloubaritsis is the author of numerous articles and books on ancient and medieval philosophy. He was awarded the Montyon Prize, the Gegner Prize of Académie des Sciences Morales et Politiques and Duculot Prize of Royal Academy of Science, Letters and Fine Arts of Belgium. Couloubaritsis is also the editor of Revue de philosophie ancienne.

Bibliography
 La philosophie face à la question de la complexité le défi majeur du 21e siècle. Tome 1 complexités intuitive, archaïque et historique (Bruxelles, Ousia, 2014)
 La proximité et la question de la souffrance humaine (Bruxelles, Ousia, 2005)
 Histoire de la philosophie ancienne et médiévale, Figures illustres (Paris, Grasset, 1998)
 La Physique d'Aristote (Bruxelles, Ousia, 1998)
 Aux origines de la philosophie européenne, De la pensée archaïque au néoplatonisme (Bruxelles, De Boeck, 1992; 3e éd. 2000; 4e édition 2004)
 Traduction, avec introduction et commentaires, du livre II de la Physique d'Aristote, Sur la Nature (Paris, Vrin, 1992)
 Mythe et Philosophie chez Parménide (Bruxelles, Ousia, 1986; 2e éd., 1990)
 Penser l'Informatique, Informatiser la Pensée. Mélanges offerts à André Robinet (Bruxelles, Editions de l'Universite de Bruxelles, 1987)
 L'avènement de la science physique (Bruxelles, Ousia, 1980)

See also 
Mohammad Ilkhani

Sources
 Centre de philosophie ancienne à l'ULB
 Lambros Couloubaritsis, docteur honoris causa de l'université Lille 3
  « L’initié, le poète, le philosophe : les chemins du savoir dans le papyrus de Derveni»

External links
 Page à l'ULB
 Unité de Recherche en Histoire Médiévale

Université libre de Bruxelles alumni
Academic staff of the Université libre de Bruxelles
1941 births
Living people
Philosophy academics
20th-century Belgian philosophers
21st-century Belgian philosophers
Scholars of medieval philosophy
Historians of philosophy
University of Liège alumni
Belgian Congo people
Aristotelian philosophers
Scholars of ancient Greek philosophy